Vidushi Shashikala Dani is an Indian Hindustani classical Jaltarang artist. She is one among the few musicians and presently the only All India Radio-graded female exponent of the Jaltarang. She is a multi-instrument artist with concert & teaching experience in Jaltarang, Harmonium, Sitar, Violin, Dilruba and Tabla. She is also an All India Radio-graded vocalist in the Gamaka genre of Hindustani Light Music.

Biography 
Shashikala earned a Bachelor of Arts and settled in Hubballi, where she married Shri Arun Dani, son of journalist T.S.R. Awardee Lt. Shri Surendra Dani. They have a son together, the musician Sugnan Dani. After working at the State Bank of Mysore for 33 years, she is now recognized as a notable Jaltarang artist, striving hard to preserve, develop, and promote this unique instrument.

Musical career 
Particularly fascinated by Jal tarang, she  decided to dedicate and develop her classical music career with a focus on this instrument.

After much experimentation with the Jaltarang, Shashikala has imbibed both "Gayaki and Tantrakari angs" in her playing style. She is trained in the Gwalior gharana school of Hindustani Classical Music under her father and Guru Pt. D. R. Warang. She has also developed multiple other styles over the years. Her specialty is "Layakari".

She is presently involved in mentoring young and passionate musical talents at her institute, Swara Naada Sangeeta Vidyalaya®.

Awards and recognitions 

 "Kitturu Rani Chennamma" Award by Government Of Karnataka – 2021
"Karnataka Kalashri" Award by Government Of Karnataka – 2020 
"B Grade" in Gamaka (Hindustani Light Music) by Prasar Bharti – All India Radio – 2018
"B-High Grade" in Jaltarang by Prasar Bharti – All India Radio – 2002
 "Gāyana Gangā" Life-Achievement Award by Padma-Vibhushan Dr.Gangubai Hangal – 2009
First at National-Level Inter-Bank Music Competition held in Chennai – 1991
 Selected twice for scholarship by Karnataka Sangeeta Nritya Academy – 1982, 1985

Concerts  

 'International Women's Day' celebration, S.J.M.V.S. Women's College, Hubballi – 2020
At Banker's Colony, Hubballi – 2020
Interview and concert at Radio Mirchi 98.3 FM – 2020
At the prestigious 'Puligere Utsav', Laxmeshwar – 2019
Krishnaveni Samskrutik Vrund, Goa – 2019
'Navaratri Utsav' at Ramakrishna-Vivekanand Ashram, Gadag – 2019
 '40th Sangeeta Sammelana' by Pt. Narasimhalu Vadavati, Raichur – 2019
 '111th Janmotsav Music Concert', Shanti-Kuteer, Vijayapura – 2019
 'Shivaratri Utsav', Siddharoodh Math, Hubballi – 2019
 'Sangeet Nrutyotsava' by Karnataka Sangeeta Nritya Academy, Chintamani – 2019
 Akhila Bhaarata Kannada Saahitya Sammelana, Dharwad – 2019
 "All-Night Sangeet Mahotsav" by Pt. Vinayak Torvi, Dharwad – 2019
 Ustad Rehmat Khan & Pt. V.D. Paluskar Smruti Sohala by Pt. Vinayak Torvi, Kurundwad – 2018
 'Raashtreeya Sangeeta Mahotsava' – National Music Festival, Karkala – 2018
 At the prestigious 'Kadambotsava', Banavasi – 2018
 24th Koti Gayatri Japa Yagna, Gayatri Tapobhoomi, Tadas – 2018
 'Shri Gavisiddeshwar Jatra Mahotsav', Gavi Math, Koppal – 2018
 'Swara Namana, Naada Namana' – Sangeeta Samavesha, Gandhi Bhavan, Bengaluru – 2017
 At the prestigious 'Karavali Utsav', Karwar – 2017
 At the prestigious 'Hampi Utsav', Hampi – 2017
 Musical event at Brahmakumaris, Mt.Abu, Rajasthan – 2017
 'Navratri Utsav', Ramkrishna Ashram, Hubballi – 2017
 Jaltarang – Vocal Jugalbandi with Sugnan Dani by TablaGyan Academy of Music, National Gallery of Modern Art, Bengaluru – 2017
 Jaltarang – Vocal Jugalbandi with Sugnan Dani at Dr. Da. Rā. Bendre Rāshtriya Smārak Trust, Dharwad – 2017
Karnataka Rajyotsava Musical Celebration, State Bank Of Mysore, Hubballi – 2016
 'Sangeet Mahotsav', Bhandarakavate, Solapur – 2016
 'MahāShivratri Utsav', Gokarna – 2016
 'MahāShivratri Utsav', Gayatri Tapobhoomi, Hubballi – 2016
 'Adamya Chetana Seva Utsav', Bengaluru – 2016
'Hubballi Kannada Sahitya Sammelan' – 2016
Jaltarang – Vocal Jugalbandi with Sugnan Dani on 'World Water Day', Dr. Da. Rā. Bendre Rāshtriya Smārak Trust, Dharwad – 2015
 Shri Manikprabhu Sansthan, Maniknagar – 2014
 Dharwad Utsav, Dharwad – 2006, 2014
 '3rd Kannada Sāhitya Sammelan', Hubballi- 2014
'State Bank of Mysore Centenary Celebrations', Hubballi – 2013
'79th All-India Kannada Sāhitya Sammelan', Vijayapura – 2013
'Women Music Festival', S.J.M.V.S. Women's College, Hubballi – 2013
 'Rare Instrumental Concert', SriRam Kala Vedike, Bengaluru – 2012
 'Jaltarang – Violin Jugalbandi' with Vadiraj Nimbargi, Dr.Mallikarjun Mansur Rāshtriya Smarak Trust, Mansur – 2010
 'Jaltarang – Sitar Jugalbandi' with Shrinivas Joshi, Hubballi and Koppal – 2008
 'Panchakshari Gavayi Punyatithi', Gadag – 2007
 'Academy of Performing Arts', Belagavi – 2007
 'Hubli Arts Circle', Hangal Music Foundation, Hubballi – 2005
 'Kundagol Music Festival', Kundagol – 1992, 2005

Discography 
 Vid. Shashikala Dani – Jaltarang Concert – Kurundwad Utsav
 Vid. Shashikala Dani – Jaltarang Concert – Karkala Utsav
 Vid. Shashikala Dani – The Only AIR & DD Recognised Classical Jaltarang Female Instrumentalist
 Jaltarang Instrumental Concert Videos by Vidushi Shashikala Dani
 Vid. Shashikala Dani – Jaltarang Concert at Hampi Utsav
 Vid. Shashikala Dani – Jaltarang Concert at Karavali Utsav
 Vid. Shashikala Dani – Jaltarang Telecast by Doordarshan
 Vid. Shashikala Dani – Jaltarang Concert at State Bank Of Mysore
 Vid. Shashikala Dani – Jaltarang Concert at Dharwad Utsav

References

External links 
 Swara Naada Sangeeta Vidyalaya

1959 births
Living people
People from Hubli
Women Hindustani musicians
Indian women classical musicians
Musicians from Karnataka
Jal tarang players
Hindustani instrumentalists
Women musicians from Karnataka
20th-century Indian women musicians
20th-century Indian musicians